MV Rotterdam Express is a container ship built in 2000 and in the Hapag-Lloyd fleet as of 2021.

Sister ships in the Dallas Express class include the lead ship Dallas Express, Seoul Express, and Tokyo Express.

History
In 2018, the ship was boarded by Colombian Navy and police forces near Cartagena, after being informed of ten stowaways by the captain. During the course of investigating the containers, 185 kg of cocaine were found and seized.

The ship was boarded by the United States Coast Guard in October 2021 in part of the investigation of the Orange County, California oil pipeline break and spill.

References

External links

 (Hapag-Lloyd)

Container ships
2000 ships
Ships built by Hyundai Heavy Industries Group